Istind, Istinden, or Istindan may refer to:

Villages
Istind, Iran, a village in South Khorasan Province, Iran

Mountains
Istind Peak, a peak on the east side of Ahlmann Ridge in Queen Maud Land, Antarctica
Istind (Greenland), a mountain in the Watkins Range, Greenland
Istindan (Målselv), a mountain in Målselv municipality, Troms county, Norway
Istinden (Lyngen), a mountain in Lyngen municipality, Troms county, Norway
Istinden (Balsfjord), a mountain in Balsfjord municipality, Troms county, Norway
Istind (Bardu), a mountain in Bardu municipality, Troms county, Norway
Istinden (Nordland), a mountain in Meløy municipality, Nordland county, Norway
Istind (Torsken), a mountain in Torsken municipality, Troms county, Norway
Istinden (Tromsø), a mountain in Tromsø municipality, Troms county, Norway